'Kistareddypet is a small village situated in Patancheru Mandal of Sangareddy district in the Indian state of Telangana. Ilapur and Patel Guda are sub-villages (Omlets). The village is zoned as a Multipurpose Residential Zone by the HMDA, and is inside the Outer Ring Road. It is off ORR Exit 3,  very near the Bollaram Industrial Area, and the Medical Equipment Zone. The reverse osmosis water supply is managed by BHEL. Some ventures in Kistareddypet include Sri Mytri Villas, BSR Colony, BHEL 3BHK Villas, BDL-1200 Villas, Meher Villas, Lakeview Enclave Villas, and Durga Nagar.

Demographics 
Kistareddypet's population as of 2020 was 5308, composed of 2725 males and 2583 females.

Education 
Schools in Kistareddypet include: 
Krishnaveni
Oakdale
Government School
ZPHS Kistareddypet

References

Villages in Sangareddy district